The Shade is a 1999 film directed by Raphael Nadjari and starring Richard Edson and Lorie Marino. Nadjari's debut feature, it is a modern adaptation of Fyodor Dostoyevsky's short story "A Gentle Creature" (1876), and takes place in contemporary New York City.

Plot
The film tells the story of a Jewish middle aged pawnbroker who meets a mysterious woman who will become his wife without their truly knowing each other. The film begins with Simon, alone in his apartment with the corpse of his wife, Anna, who has just committed suicide. In his grief, he remembers the first time he met her, a year ago when she walked into his pawnbroker's shop in Spanish Harlem. Mysterious Anna, who seems to come from nowhere, impresses solitary Simon with her beauty, and he proposes to her on their first night out. They then enter into a passionate relationship that will lead her to death.

Awards and nominations
 1999 Cannes Film Festival - Official Selection, Un Certain Regard
 Bergamo Film Festival (1999) - Audience Award

References

External links

Review in the New York Times

1998 films
Films directed by Raphael Nadjari
1998 drama films
American drama films
Films based on works by Fyodor Dostoyevsky
Films based on short fiction
Films set in New York City
1999 drama films
1999 films
1990s English-language films
1990s American films